Dialectica columellina is a moth of the family Gracillariidae. It is known from South Africa.

The larvae feed on Pavonia columella. They probably mine the leaves of their host plant.

References

Endemic moths of South Africa
Dialectica (moth)
Moths of Africa
Moths described in 1961